The Hundred of O'Loughlin is a cadastral hundred of South Australia established in 1898 in the remote County of Way.

The main town of the hundred is Koonibba which began life as an aboriginal mission. The traditional owners of the area are the Wirangu Aboriginal people though Mirning and Kokatha also live in the hundred now.

References

O'Loughlin